Wang Nianchun (born 26 October 1956) is a Chinese speed skater. He competed at the 1980 Winter Olympics and the 1984 Winter Olympics.

References

External links
 

1956 births
Living people
Chinese male speed skaters
Olympic speed skaters of China
Speed skaters at the 1980 Winter Olympics
Speed skaters at the 1984 Winter Olympics
Place of birth missing (living people)